Pancha Tattva may refer to:
Panchatattva (Tantra)
Pancha Tattva (Vaishnavism)